If Women Only Knew is a 1921 American silent drama film directed by Edward H. Griffith and starring Robert Gordon, Madelyn Clare and Blanche Davenport.

Cast
 Robert Gordon as Maurice Travers
 Madelyn Clare as Madeline Marshall
 Blanche Davenport as Mrs. Travers
 Virginia Lee as Donna Wayne
 Pierre Gendron as Billie Thorne 
 Frederick Burton as Donna's Father
 Charles Lane as Dr. John Strong
 Harold Vosburgh as Professor Storey

References

Bibliography
 Munden, Kenneth White. The American Film Institute Catalog of Motion Pictures Produced in the United States, Part 1. University of California Press, 1997.

External links
 

1921 films
1921 drama films
1920s English-language films
American silent feature films
Silent American drama films
American black-and-white films
Films directed by Edward H. Griffith
Film Booking Offices of America films
1920s American films